Gordonia ceylanica is a species of plant in the family Theaceae. It is endemic to Sri Lanka.

Culture
It is known as "සුදු මිහිරිය - sudu mihiriya" in Sinhala.

Chemical constituents
The plant contains the oleanane-type triterpenoids 3beta-acetoxy-11alpha(2',3'-epoxyferulyloxy)-olean-13(18)-ene and α-spinasterol.

References

Additional sources

 http://www.corbetsview.com/flowers/Sudu-mihiriya.htm
 http://dl.nsf.ac.lk/handle/1/11802
 http://www.instituteofayurveda.org/plants/plants_detail.php?i=1294&s=Family_name
 http://plants.jstor.org/specimen/k000704174?history=true

Flora of Sri Lanka
ceylanica